Viking Ship Museum may refer to:

 Viking Ship Museum (Oslo)
 Viking Ship Museum (Roskilde)

See also
 Viking ship replica
 Viking ships
 Viking (disambiguation)